Chaubise is a rural municipality (gaunpalika) out of four rural municipality located in Dhankuta District of Province No. 1 of Nepal. There are a total of 7 municipalities in Dhankuta in which 3 are urban and 4 are rural.

To form this new Rural Municipality 6 No. Budhabare, Mudebas, Kuruletenupa, Bodhe, Rajarani, Maunabuthuk and Basantatar were merged, which previously were all separate Village development committee (local level administrative villages). Fulfilling the requirement of the new Constitution of Nepal 2015, Ministry of Federal Affairs and Local Development replaced all old VDCs and Municipalities into 753 new local level body (Municipality).

The Gaunpalika is divided into 8 wards and the Rajarani, Dhankuta is the Headquarter of this newly formed rural municipality.

Demographics
At the time of the 2011 Nepal census, Chaubise Rural Municipality had a population of 19,283. Of these, 32.6% spoke Limbu, 29.0% Nepali, 15.8% Magar, 7.8% Yakkha, 6.2% Tamang, 3.9% Yamphu, 2.1% Rai, 0.6% Majhi, 0.4% Newar and 1.4% other languages as their first language.

In terms of ethnicity/caste, 33.6% were Limbu, 15.9% Magar, 11.5% Chhetri, 8.8% Yakkha, 6.5% Tamang, 4.6% Hill Brahmin, 3.6% Rai, 3.5% Kami, 3.3% Yamphu and 8.7% others.

In terms of religion, 45.9% were Kirati, 33.2% Hindu, 18.5% Buddhist, 1.6% Christian, 0.1% Prakriti and 0.7% others.

References

External links
 Official website

Rural municipalities in Koshi Province
Populated places in Dhankuta District
Rural municipalities of Nepal established in 2017
Rural municipalities in Dhankuta District